The Azerbaijan is a state-owned newspaper and public journal published by the National Assembly of Azerbaijan.

History 
The official newspaper of the ADR government "Azerbaijan" was established in 1918. The government by its order of 3 July 1918, decided on the launch of the publication "the News of Azerbaijani Republic" under its official authority. Thus, the first issue of the "Azerbaijan" newspaper was published as the parliamentary paper on 15 September 1918, on the same day, when the Caucasus Islamic Army freed Baku from Armenian-Bolshevik invasion. One of the editors of the official government newspaper the Azerbaijan was Jeyhun Hajibeyli. The newspaper was published till 28 December 1919 with the signature of Uzeyir Hajibeyli's brother Jeyhun. There is no doubt about his great contribution for the publication of the newspaper.  After the collapse of the Azerbaijan Democratic Republic, Jeyhun Hajibeyli, who was forced to leave the country and to immigrate to Europe, tried to issue the newspaper there and in 1951 he was able to achieve his goal in Munich (Germany).

Editors 
One of the editor-in-chief of the newspaper was Uzeyir Hajibayli. He wrote over 100 articles on politics, economics, culture and education, etc. for the Azerbaijan newspaper. The chief editor of the Russian version of the newspaper was Sefi Bek Rustambeyli. The newspaper was also written by Mammad Amin Resulzadeh, Khalil Ibrahim, Farhad Aghazadeh, Ibrahim Gasimov, Mukhamed aga Shahtakhtly, Adil Khan Ziyadkhanov, Alabbas Musnib, and Shafiga Efendizadeh.

See also 
List of newspapers in Azerbaijan

References

External links
 
  

Government gazettes
Newspapers published in Azerbaijan
Azerbaijani-language newspapers
Publications established in 1918
1918 establishments in Azerbaijan